Eric Maurice Washington (born March 23, 1974) is an American former National Basketball Association (NBA) player.

Washington attended the University of Alabama, where he scored 1,532 points, grabbed 557 rebounds, and made 262 three-point field goals. He was selected in the 1997 NBA Draft as the 46th overall pick by the Orlando Magic, and appeared for the Denver Nuggets during two seasons, from 1997 to 1999.

He also played professionally in China, Finland, and for the Idaho Stampede of the CBA. In 2010, he signed with Nürnberger BC in Germany.

External links
NBA.com profile - Eric Washington
Career statistics

1974 births
Living people
20th-century African-American sportspeople
21st-century African-American sportspeople
African-American basketball players
Alabama Crimson Tide men's basketball players
American expatriate basketball people in China
American expatriate basketball people in Finland
American expatriate basketball people in Germany
American expatriate basketball people in Greece
American expatriate basketball people in Israel
American expatriate basketball people in Italy
American men's basketball players
Basketball players from Mississippi
Basket Rimini Crabs players
Dafnis B.C. players
Denver Nuggets players
Hapoel Jerusalem B.C. players
Idaho Stampede players
Israeli Basketball Premier League players
Kauhajoen Karhu players
KTP-Basket players
NINERS Chemnitz players
Nürnberg Falcons BC players
Orlando Magic draft picks
People from Pearl, Mississippi
Shooting guards
Tampereen Pyrintö players